NBC Portland can refer to:

KGW, the NBC television affiliate in Portland, Oregon.
WCSH, the NBC television affiliate in Portland, Maine.